Nidrou is a town in western Ivory Coast. It is a sub-prefecture of Kouibly Department in Guémon Region, Montagnes District.

Nidrou was a commune until March 2012, when it became one of 1126 communes nationwide that were abolished.

In 2014, the population of the sub-prefecture of Nidrou was 10,343.

Villages
The seven villages of the sub-prefecture of Nidrou and their population in 2014 are:
 Diotrou (1 360)
 Nidrou (3 359)
 Oulayably (938)
 Pany (514)
 Piandrou (1 098)
 Sahidrou (664)
 Trokpadrou (2 410)

Notes

Sub-prefectures of Guémon
Former communes of Ivory Coast